KM-8 Gran is a Russian 120mm guided mortar weapon system with Malakhit fire control system using semi-active laser guidance to perform a top attack and able to attack moving and stationary targets.

Several mortars using this system can fire simultaneously without interfering with each other and the system is using common data for targets spaced at up to 300 m. Gran projectiles can be fired from smoothbore and rifled mortars.

See also
Kitolov-2M
Krasnopol (weapon system)

References

Weapons of Russia
Mortar munitions